Pavel Viktorovich Torgaev (born January 25, 1966) is a Russian former professional ice hockey player who played 55 games in the National Hockey League for the Calgary Flames and Tampa Bay Lightning.  An 11th round draft pick by the Flames, 279th overall in the 1994 NHL Entry Draft, Torgaev had been playing pro in his native Russia since 1982.

Playing career
Torgaev spent 12 seasons in the Soviet League before moving to Finland for two years in 1993.  After being drafted by the Flames, Torgaev came to North America, where he appeared in 41 regular season games with the Flames in 1995–96, recording six goals and ten assists in 41 games.  After returning to Europe to play in Switzerland for three seasons, Torgaev once again returned to the NHL in 1999–2000, Torgaev appeared in nine more games with the Flames before being claimed by Tampa Bay on waivers.  After playing five more games with the Lightning, he refused an assignment to the minor leagues, and returned to Russia, where he remained until his retirement following the 2004–05 season.

Torgaev represented his nation internationally several times.  He was a member of the bronze medal winning Soviet team at the 1985 World Junior Hockey Championships.  Torgaev was also a member of the Russian squad at the 1994 Winter Olympics, scoring two goals as the Russians finished fourth.  In 1995, he again represented Russia at the Ice Hockey World Championships.

Career statistics

Regular season and playoffs

International

External links

1966 births
Calgary Flames draft picks
Calgary Flames players
HC Davos players
HC Fribourg-Gottéron players
HC Lugano players
Ice hockey players at the 1994 Winter Olympics
JYP Jyväskylä players
Living people
Olympic ice hockey players of Russia
Russian ice hockey centres
Saint John Flames players
Severstal Cherepovets players
Soviet ice hockey centres
Sportspeople from Nizhny Novgorod
Tampa Bay Lightning players
Torpedo Nizhny Novgorod players
HC TPS players